Nu Doradus, Latinized from ν Doradus, is a single, blue-white hued star in the southern constellation of Dorado. It is visible to the naked eye with an apparent visual magnitude of +5.06. Based upon an annual parallax shift of 10.88 mas as seen from Earth, it is located about 300 light years from the Sun. At that distance, the visual magnitude is diminished by an extinction of 0.07 due to interstellar dust. It is moving further from the Sun with a heliocentric radial velocity of +17.5 km/s.

This is an ordinary B-type main-sequence star, as indicated by its stellar classification of B8 V. It is an estimated 118 million years old and is spinning with a projected rotational velocity of 98 km/s. The star has 2.7 times the mass of the Sun and about 3.2 times the Sun's radius. It is radiating 107 times the Sun's luminosity from its photoshere at an effective temperature of 11,381 K. No infrared excess has been detected.

References

B-type main-sequence stars
Doradus, Nu
Dorado (constellation)
043107
029134
2221
Durchmusterung objects